Nagarparkar , is a tehsil in at the base of the Karoonjhar Mountains in Tharparkar District in Sindh province of Pakistan.
The historic Churrio Jabal Durga Mata Temple is situated here. The taluka is located at a distance of 129 km from Mithi, in Sindh, Pakistan.

Description
The name comes from the original word Nangar Parkar. It is at the foot of the Karoonjhar Hills. It is situated at a distance of about 16 km from south and about 23 from east from the Indian border. At one time the area was under the sea, which had to be crossed; the name "Parkar" means "to cross over". Nagarparkar has Taluka Chachro on its north, and on its west is Taluka Mithi of Tharparkar District, while on east of it lies Barmer (Rajasthan) and on its south is Rann Kachchh. The surrounding area is a rocky belt called Parkar, and the remaining part is a sandy area.

The Karoonjhar hills surround Nagarparkar for 16 miles. The granite stone of this mountain is used for making tiles. There is a saying that the Karoonjhar hills provide 1-1/4 kilos of gold every day in the form of red granite stone, china clay, and honey. In summer, different sounds are audible from the rock due to sulfur deposits.

Nagarparkar Jain temples

The region once had a significant Jain population. Shri Gaudi Parshvanth Stavan in 1650 described the Parkar as the most glorious of all regions of India.

The remains of a number of Jain temples are popular tourist attractions and heritage sites in the region.

Churrio Jabal Durga Mata Temple

Churrio Jabal Durga Mata Temple, on Churrio Jabal hill in Choryo village, is one of the two Hindu temples in this place.  On Shivratri 200,000 pilgrims visit the temples. Hindus cremate the dead and ashes are preserved till Shivratri for immersion in the into holy water. Richer Pakistani Hindus go to India to immerse the ashes in Ganges and the rest visit Nagarparkar to immerse the ashes. This area has been leased by the government for the mining by dynamite blasting of the hills on which the temples are located. This is posing a threat to the temples. Angry pilgrims held a protest against mining.

Demographics
The population of the taluka is 153,106, out of which 90,893 are Hindus and 62,213 are Muslims. There is one rest house beneath the Karoonjhar Mountain, but it partially collapsed during the 2001 Gujarat earthquake. This region is now a significant place of worship for the minority Hindu community due to the temple being located there. Sardharo, Anchlesar, and Jain temples are situated there.

Gallery

See also

 Hinglaj Mata mandir
Sant Nenuram Ashram

References

External links
 
 

Hindu temples in Sindh
Shiva temples
History of Pakistan
Ruins in Pakistan
Populated places in Sindh
Tharparkar District
Jainism in Pakistan